The Newry Reporter was established in 1867 by James Burns  and is the oldest newspaper serving the Newry and Mourne region of Northern Ireland, UK.

History
After the death of James Burns in 1902, the paper was sold to Joseph Wright who operated a printing works in Hill Street.

The paper would be in Wrights ownership for just seven years before a fire at the works saw Wright move to Canada. 

Robert Sands acquired the rights to the paper and began printing again after a four-month stoppage since the fire. 

In 1912, the paper moved offices from Clanrye Grain Mills (owned by Sands) to Margaret Street, where it remains to this day. 

After Sands' death in 1915, the paper was published by the executors until 1927 when Edward Hodgett bought the rights. 

The paper remains in the Hodgett family to this day.

On Jan. 11, 2023, the paper announced it would cease publication on Jan. 25.

Current operations
The paper is now published weekly on a Wednesday (although the front cover states Thursday) after trying both bi- & tri-weekly runs throughout its history. 

The paper's look and feel had a major refresh in May 2007 when it relaunched as a full colour 'compact'. Today its main competitor in the region is the Newry Democrat. According to ABC figures (Jan-Jun 2013) the Newry Reporter sells 9,842 copies per week, with the Newry Democrats distribution in the region of 6,000 copies.

References

External links
 Newry Reporters updated ABC Certificate
 Newry Reporter website

Newspapers published in Northern Ireland
Reporter
Mass media in County Down